William Kevin Lescher (born 1958) is a retired four-star admiral in the United States Navy who last served as the 41st Vice Chief of Naval Operations. He held this office from May 29, 2020, to September 2, 2022. Lescher was also the "Old Goat", the longest serving Naval Academy graduate on active duty, from 2018 to 2022.

Naval career

A native of Highland Park, Illinois, he graduated from the United States Naval Academy in 1980. Trained as a helicopter pilot, Lescher served with HSL-36 and HSL-44 and later commanded HSL-48, HSL-40, the Atlantic Fleet Helicopter Maritime Strike Wing, Expeditionary Strike Group Five and Task Forces 51/59 in Bahrain.

In May 2020, Lescher was nominated by President Donald Trump for promotion to admiral and assignment as the next Vice Chief of Naval Operations. He assumed this office and rank on May 29, 2020.

Awards and decorations

Lescher graduated with distinction from fixed wing, rotary wing and Naval Test Pilot School training. He has been recognized as the Association of Naval Aviation's HSL Pilot of the Year, the Naval Helicopter Association's Regional Pilot of the Year and the Naval Air Warfare Center's Rotary Wing Test Pilot of the Year. The units in which he has served have earned the Joint Meritorious Unit Award, Navy Unit Commendation, Navy Meritorious Unit Commendation, Navy "E" Ribbons and Theodore Ellyson award.

References

1958 births
Living people
People from Highland Park, Illinois
United States Naval Academy alumni
Military personnel from Illinois
United States Naval Aviators
Naval Postgraduate School alumni
United States Naval Test Pilot School alumni
Harvard Business School alumni
Recipients of the Navy Distinguished Service Medal
Recipients of the Defense Superior Service Medal
Recipients of the Legion of Merit
United States Navy admirals